The Investitionsbank Berlin (IBB) is a development bank and central promotional institute of the state of Berlin. The aim of the funding is the Berlin economy and housing construction.

The main task of IBB is business development of small and medium-sized enterprises (SME). With the monetary promotion offers, a comprehensive financing consultation and a management and business-oriented promotion and loan processing.  The focus for IBB is innovative, technology-oriented companies based in Berlin. In addition, IBB offers individual financing solutions for investors in the area of real estate promotion.

History
 1924: founded as Wohnungsfürsorgegesellschaft Berlin mbH to finance Berlin housing construction
 1937: conversion to the housing loan institute of the capital city of Berlin (as a legal municipality)
 1965: conversion to the Housing Loan Institute Berlin as a public institute. The Wohnungsbau-Kreditanstalt Berlin becomes a capital collection point for loans according to § 17 Berlin Promotion Act.
 1993: conversion into the Investment Bank Berlin under expansion of the tasks on the economic promotion; Integration into Landesbank Berlin as an economically and organizationally independent department
 2004: spin-off from the Landesbank Berlin and separation as Investment Bank Berlin, public institute with Anstaltslast and Refinanzierungsgarantie of Berlin

Significant investments 
IBB is involved in numerous companies in order to fulfill its mandate as the central development bank of the state of Berlin. There are two groups, participations, which are held on behalf of the city, and participations, which are held in connection with promotional tasks.

Held on behalf of the city
 Medienboard Berlin-Brandenburg GmbH 
 Berlin Partner GmbH Berlin Tourism & Congress GmbH

Held in connection with promotional tasks
 IBB Beteiligungsgesellschaft mbH 
 IBB Business Team GmbH

References

Banks established in 1924
Banks of Germany
Companies based in Berlin
Development finance institutions